Cecil "Cis" Baker (born in Darnall, West Riding of Yorkshire) was an English footballer. He began his professional career with Blackpool in 1920, making two League appearances for the Seasiders.

References

Year of birth missing
Year of death missing
English footballers
Blackpool F.C. players
Chesterfield F.C. players
Shirebrook Miners Welfare F.C. players
Creswell Colliery F.C. players
Beighton Miners Welfare F.C. players
Footballers from Sheffield
Association football defenders
Association football forwards
People from Darnall